Hrefnesholt is a location in Beowulf where the Geatish king Hæþcyn had taken the Swedish queen. The Swedish king Ongenþeow arrived to save her and killed Hæþcyn. The Geatish force was, however, reinforced by Hygelac, whereupon the Swedes sought refuge in a hillfort, but were stormed by the Geats. Ongenþeow was killed and Hygelac became their new king.

A place by this name, Ramshult (the modern Swedish form), actually exists and it has a hillfort. It is located on the island of Orust, an island which was Geatish territory at this time according to Nordisk familjebok.

Geats
Beowulf